Hinteres Fiescherhorn is a summit of the Bernese Alps and build together with Grosses and Kleines Fiescherhorn the Fiescherhörner. It is located in the Swiss canton of Valais near the border with the canton of Berne.

See also

List of 4000 metre peaks of the Alps

References

External links
Hinteres Fiescherhorn on Hikr

Alpine four-thousanders
Mountains of the Alps
Mountains of Switzerland
Mountains of Valais
Bernese Alps
Four-thousanders of Switzerland